Kabissa – Space for Change in Africa is a volunteer-led non-governmental organization that promotes Information and Communication Technology (ICT) to empower and connect people and civil society organizations (CSO) for positive change in Africa. Kabissa members are active throughout Africa, working on a range of crucial tasks including Advocacy and Policy, Arts, Culture, Conflict Resolution, Humanitarian Services, Economic Development, Poverty Reduction, Education, Environment, Gender, Governance, Health, Human Rights, Democracy, Media, Journalism, Microfinance, Technology, Training, and Capacity Building.

Kabissa headquarters are on Bainbridge Island, Washington (state), although the organization operates mostly online and boasts contributors from all over the world.  The founder of the organization is Tobias Eigen who led Kabissa together with Kimberly Lowery from 2002-2007.

Introduction

Kabissa, meaning complete in Swahili, helps African civil society organizations put Internet and Communications Technology (ICT) to work for the benefit of their communities. Founded in 1999 by Tobias Eigen, Kabissa initially provided domain hosting services, then capacity-building through a custom training curriculum and manual, and is currently dedicated to connecting people and organizations for Africa via the social media platform.

Membership

Anyone interested in Africa can create a free account, subscribe to newsletters and participate in groups. Nearly everyone in the Kabissa network is involved in organizations working on the continent that are listed in the Kabissa Organization Directory and displayed on the Kabissa Map.

Kabissa's member organizations are varied in nature and are thus are an indicator of overall African civil society sector. These members range from newly established localized organizations working in human rights and social justice to large, well-established organizations doing far-reaching environmental work. Currently, Kabissa's member organizations categorize themselves into the following focus areas:

 Advocacy and Policy
 Arts and Culture
 Conflict Resolution
 Direct Social and Humanitarian Services
 Economic Development and Poverty Reduction
 Education
 Environment
 Gender
 Governance
 Health
 Human Rights and Democracy
 Media and Journalism
 Microfinance
 Technology
 Training and Capacity Building
 Youth

Kabissa Board of Directors

Current
 John Githongo, Kenya
 Neema Mgana, Tanzania
 Tobias Eigen, Germany/USA
 George Scharffenberger, USA
 Jeff Thindwa, Malawi

Former
 Firoze Manji, Kenya
 Kimberly Lowery, USA
 Peter Eigen, Germany
 Daniel Ritchie, USA

Affiliations
 Aid for Africa Foundation
 Global Washington

Kabissa's Charter

Kabissa operates under the following charter:

Mission
Kabissa’s mission is to help African civil society organizations put Internet and Communications Technology (ICT) to work for the benefit of the people they serve.

Vision
Kabissa’s vision is for a socially, economically, politically, and environmentally vibrant Africa, supported by a strong network of effective civil society organizations.

Principles
Kabissa seeks to adhere to the following principles in its operations and governance:

  To work in close cooperation with partner organizations that can provide local expertise, support, and resources wherever possible
 To make its operations transparent to the Kabissa community and the general public
 To employ the services of companies that share Kabissa’s vision whenever possible. In all cases, the organizations will show professional integrity and provide the best value, so that Kabissa can pass on high-quality, affordable services to the Kabissa community
 To avoid any source of income derived from activities which indisputably conflict with our vision
 To be a highly-efficient organization, keeping overhead costs to a minimum
 To develop, use, and promote software and content that is freely available under open source licensing agreements
 To embrace a diversity of perspectives in our member community, our staff, and our board

History

Kabissa was founded in 1999 by Tobias Eigen with the idea that Internet and Communications Technology (ICT) could revolutionize the work of African civil society. Building on the years of consulting experience Tobias Eigen had had with African civil society, Kabissa began by providing African organizations with accessible, affordable, and secure internet services.

During the next three years Kabissa showed strong growth and gained increasing recognition. In June, 2002 Kabissa won the ICT Stories Competition, an initiative of infoDev and the International Institute of Communication and Development (IICD) which sought to capture the learning process that accompanies the introduction and implementation of ICTs for development. In September, 2002 Kabissa added a part-time Program Manager, Kim Lowery, to its staff. By November, 2002 Kabissa was awarded its first major grant from the German Agency for Technical Cooperation (GTZ) for the pilot phase of Kabissa’s Time To Get Online training initiative. They went on to set up an office at Dupont Circle in Washington DC where for the next five years three employees and dozens of interns and volunteers worked on its programs with funding from major foundations including the Ford Foundation, Open Society Institute Information Program, the Hurford Foundation, National Endowment for Democracy, Yahoo Employee Foundation, and Lonely Planet Foundation (now Planet Wheeler Foundation). They also trained hundreds of activists and development practitioners in end user and training of trainers workshops and distributed thousands of copies of the Time To Get Online manual. In partnership with Tanmia in Morocco, the Time To Get Online manual and training program was localized into French and Arabic.

From April 2005 through March 2008, Kabissa administered the PanAfrican Localisation Project, which was funded by the International Development Research Centre of Canada.

In 2007, Kabissa followed its founder, Tobias Eigen, to Bainbridge Island, WA, and became a volunteer organization with no employees. In 2009, Kabissa announced a new focus on social media in Africa. At the same time, Kabissa streamlined its internet services and shut down the server hosting websites for its member organizations.

As of May, 2010 Kabissa had 1504 member organizations representing over 50 African countries, and included internationally renowned human rights groups, charities, development organizations and orphanages.

References

Information and communication technologies in Africa
Non-profit technology